The 2020 Miami-Dade County mayoral election was held on November 3, 2020, to determine the Mayor of Miami-Dade County, Florida, beginning on November 17, 2020. County Commissioner Daniella Levine Cava defeated fellow commissioner Esteban Bovo. Incumbent Mayor Carlos A. Giménez, first elected in 2011, was term-limited; instead running for the U.S. House of Representatives and winning to represent Florida's 26th congressional district.

The election was officially non-partisan. A top-two primary election for this office was held on August 18, 2020, with county commissioners Esteban Bovo and Daniella Levine Cava advancing to a runoff election scheduled for November 3, 2020.

Candidates

Advanced to run-off
Esteban Bovo, Miami-Dade County commissioner (Republican)
 Daniella Levine Cava, Miami-Dade County commissioner (Democratic)

Eliminated in primary 
 Monique Nicole Barley, businesswoman and daughter of former State Representative Roy Hardemon (Democratic)
 Carlos de Armas, businessman and Uber driver (independent, write-in)
 Ludmilla Domond, real estate agent (Republican)
Alex Penelas, former Mayor of Miami-Dade County (Democratic)
Xavier Suarez, Miami-Dade County commissioner and former mayor of Miami (Independent)

Withdrawn 

 Robert Ingram Burke, candidate for mayor of Miami in 2017 (Independent)
 Jean Monestime, Miami-Dade County commissioner (Democratic)
Juan Zapata, Miami-Dade County commissioner (Republican)

Declined 
 Luther Campbell, rapper and candidate for mayor of Miami-Dade County in 2011 (Democratic)
 Carlos Curbelo, former United States representative (Republican)
Carlos Lopez-Cantera, former Lieutenant Governor of Florida (Republican)
 Bernie Navarro, former president of the Latin Builders Association (Republican)

Primary election

Endorsements

Polling

Results

General election

Polling

Results

Notes

Partisan clients

References

External links
Official campaign websites for mayoral candidates
 Esteban Bovo (R) for Mayor
 Daniella Levine Cava (D) for Mayor

Mayoral elections in Miami-Dade County, Florida
Miami-Dade County mayoral
Miami-Dade